Štefan Tarkovič (born 18 February 1973) is a Slovak football manager. He was the manager of Slovakia. He previously managed the teams Žilina, Tatran Prešov and Košice.

Managerial statistics

External links
 MFK Košice profile

References

1973 births
Living people
Sportspeople from Prešov
Slovak footballers
1. FC Tatran Prešov players
FC VSS Košice managers
1. FC Tatran Prešov managers
MŠK Žilina managers
Slovak football managers
Slovak Super Liga managers
Association football fullbacks
Slovakia national football team managers
UEFA Euro 2020 managers